Cream soda is a soft drink.

Cream soda also may refer to:

 an early computer project by Steve Wozniak
 Cream Soda (band), Russian musical group

See also
 Ice cream soda